Ketib is a transcription of various words in Semitic languages, and may refer to:

 Qere and Ketiv, in Hebrew textual criticism
 Katib or secretary, a position in Arabic-speaking monarchies